Radio Thailand Satun is a Thailand government radio station which is owned by the Public Relations Department. It broadcasts in Satun Province, parts of Trang Province, Songkhla Province and Phatthalung Province. It can be received in Malaysia in places such as Perlis, Langkawi, northern Kedah and Penang. Radio Thailand Satun broadcasts on two FM frequencies and one AM frequency with 1 kW and 10 kW transmitter power output respectively. It provides information, knowledge and entertainment to the listeners.

Frequencies
 FM 95.5 MHz from Tambon Khuan Khan district cover Satun province, Malaysia: Perlis, Langkawi and North Kedah (Jitra, Bukit Kayu Hitam, Kuala Kedah, Kuala Nerang, Ayer Hitam, Kubang Pasu, Alor Setar, Pendang and parts of Yan) as well as parts of Trang, Songkhla and Phatthalung.
FM 99.5 MHz from Tambon Khuan Khan district cover Satun province, Malaysia: Perlis, Langkawi, Penang as well as parts of Trang, Songkhla and Phatthalung.
 AM 1206 kHz from Khuan Khan Muang covers Satun provinces.

NOTE: Radio Thailand FM 95.5 MHz and FM 99.5 MHz have different programmes.

Programs
 FM 95.5 MHz – General service, entertainment, music, local information, news and knowledge for Satun community.
 FM 99.5 MHz – Life and social, but most programs are broadcast via Radio Thailand Bangkok FM 92.5 MHz/AM 891 kHz (National radio network) and Radio Thailand AM 918 kHz ASEAN-language radio network.

References
 Radio Thailand Satun FM 95.5 schedule
 Radio Thailand Satun FM 99.5 schedule
 About Radio Thailand Satun

External links
 Radio Thailand Satun FM 95.5 Official Website

Radio stations in Thailand